Johnson City Independent School District is a public school district based in Johnson City, Texas (USA).

Located in Blanco County, small portions of the district extend into Hays, Llano and Travis counties.

In 2009, the school district was rated "academically acceptable" by the Texas Education Agency.

Schools
Lyndon B. Johnson High School (Grades 9-12)
Lyndon B. Johnson Middle School (Grades 5-8)
Lyndon B. Johnson Elementary School (Grades PK-4)

Notable alumni
Notable alumni of the Johnson City schools include:

Lyndon B. Johnson, 36th President of the United States
Jesse Sublett, author and musician
Sedrick Shaw, former Iowa Hawkeyes and NFL running back
Rita Benson LeBlanc, former heir-apparent of the New Orleans Saints

References

External links
Johnson City ISD

School districts in Blanco County, Texas
School districts in Hays County, Texas
School districts in Llano County, Texas
School districts in Travis County, Texas